WFER (1230 AM) is a radio station broadcasting a classic country format. Licensed to Iron River, Michigan, it first began broadcasting in 1949. The station's format changed in early July 2015 to classic hits from talk.  Some programming was derived from Westwood One's Classic Hits-Rock 24/7 format.

WIKB had previously been a simulcast of WIKB-FM 99.1's oldies format until the stations were sold to Heartland Communications. Heartland continued the oldies format on AM 1230 while changing FM 99.1 to adult contemporary as "The Breeze." WIKB soon dropped oldies in favor of adult standards.

In May 2010, former Armada Media CEO Jim Coursolle and his wife Diane closed on a purchase of a two-thirds interest in owner Heartland Communications from Granite Equity Partners. In early June, the Coursolles changed the format of WIKB-FM to country music, and announced plans to drop the America's Best Music adult standards format on AM 1230 (which had changed its calls to WFER in May) in favor of a conservative talk format featuring personalities such as Glenn Beck, Rush Limbaugh, Sean Hannity, Laura Ingraham, and Michael Savage. The new format is dubbed "Freedom Talk." A similar format has been installed on sister stations WATW in Ashland, Wisconsin, WNBI in Park Falls, Wisconsin, and WERL in Eagle River, Wisconsin; WATW and WERL formerly aired Dial Global's Adult Standards feed (as did WIKB/WFER) while WNBI was an ESPN Radio affiliate.

WFER was sold effective June 30, 2015 to Stephen Marks' Iron River Community Broadcasting Corporation, at a purchase price of $488,000. The sale included sister station WIKB-FM, as well as co-owned WCQM and WPFP. WFER changed its format to classic hits following the sale.

References
Michiguide.com - WIKB History

External links

FER
Classic country radio stations in the United States
Radio stations established in 1949
1949 establishments in Michigan